The Parker Jointless "Lucky Curve" is a range of fountain pens released by the Parker Pen Company in late 1897. The pen used the Lucky Curve ink supply system, designed to draw ink even when the pen was not in use, which was invented and patented by George Safford Parker in 1894. The pen was named "Jointless" because of its one-piece ink barrel, designed to prevent leakage, an innovation at the time – though the design made the refilling process messy. The pen was Parker's first to be advertised outside the United States. The American government purchased the pens in large quantities and a Parker Jointless was one of the pens used to sign the Spanish–American Treaty of Paris in 1898.

In 1894 and following successive improvements to his 1889 patent, George S. Parker perfected the Curve Tubular Overfeed. In 1896 this device would be improved and adapted as underfeed in the #2X Parker models according with Patent No. 606,231, which came to be known as Lucky Curve. This innovative element established a continuous capillary connection between the nib and the inner walls of the barrel avoiding some of the particular problems that, in its time, had the use of fountain pens; difficulty starting the ink flow when starting to write; poor, excessive, or uneven ink flow; ink dripping from the pen when the reservoir was not full or nearly empty, and ink overflowing through the section when the pen was reversed after use.

In his constant search for improvement, Parker tackled the common problem of ink-stained fingers, eliminating the joint between the barrel and the section, whether it was this union by thread or by friction of both elements. A particularly delicate area since it is from there that we take the fountain pen while writing.

“The Pen with no joint to leak; no threads to break. The pen with the Lucky Curve. The success of the pen age. You cannot soil your fingers with a Parker Jointless.”

"Sour Look, soiled fingers and spotted clothes identify the man who did not use a Geo. S. Parker fountain pen.”

His invention of a "Jointless" fountain pen -without joints- added extra security to the use of these writing instruments. In late 1897 Parker was already producing the Jointless Lucky Curve.

The Parker Jointless are easily distinguishable at the base of the barrel as they have added a zero as first figure over the equivalent models with joint old style.

See also
Parker Jotter
Parker Duofold
Writing implement
Quink

References

External links
A newspaper advertisement for the Parker Jointless, featuring letters of praise

Parker pens
Products introduced in 1899